Ernest Lynn Waldorf (May 14, 1876 – July 27, 1943) was an American bishop of the Methodist Episcopal Church, elected in 1920.

He was born  on a farm in the South Valley, Otsego County, New York. Waldorf united with the Central New York Annual Conference of the M.E. Church in 1900.  Prior to his election to the episcopacy, Waldorf served as a pastor, and as a chaplain in the 74th Regt. of the National Guard in Buffalo, New York, 1911–15.

His son was football coach Pappy Waldorf.

While a bishop in Kansas City, Missouri, in the 1920s, he championed a proposed Lincoln and Lee University that would be built on the battlefield of the Battle of Westport (biggest battle west of the Mississippi River).  The university would be named for Abraham Lincoln and Robert E. Lee and be built around a proposed national memorial to fallen Civil War soldiers.  The school would eventually form the basis of what is the University of Missouri-Kansas City (and is not affiliated with the church).

He offered invocations at the 1928 Republican National Convention (fourth day, June 15, 1928) and the 1936 Republican National Convention (second day, June 10, 1936).

He died after a few months illness, on July 27, 1943, in the Noble Foundation Hospital, Alexandria Bay, New York.  He was buried in Oakwood Cemetery in Syracuse, New York.

Selected writings
 Sermons, Addresses and Radio Talks, typed mss., in the Methodist Bishops' Collection at Perkins School of Theology, Southern Methodist University
 Address:  "Riches," Book of the Sesqui-Centennial of American Methodism, 1934
 The Use of Hardship, Sermons By the Sea, 1939

See also
 List of bishops of the United Methodist Church

References

External links
 

1876 births
1943 deaths
20th-century Methodist bishops
American Methodist bishops
American sermon writers
Bishops of the Methodist Episcopal Church
Burials at Oakwood Cemetery (Syracuse, New York)
People from Kansas City, Missouri
People from Otsego County, New York
United States Army chaplains
World War I chaplains